The Conrado Yap-class was a series of ex-South Korean Haksaeng-class patrol boats sold to the Philippine Navy in 1993.

12 of these patrol boats were transferred to the Philippine Navy, and are all retired as of 2018.

History
The Philippine Navy received 12 fast attack craft patrol vessels (also known as Schoolboy or Seahawk class) from the Republic of Korea in 1993. The ships were sold to the Philippines for a token sum of $100 USD each, part of growing relations between the two countries at the time. The initial condition of the vessels was unclear and they subsequently went through various refit programs.

When the vessels were actually commissioned varies from source to source. Many suggest that 10 of the 12 were commissioned on 19 June 1993, while others suggest that eight were commissioned in June 1993 and two more in June 1994. Another source suggests that six were commissioned in 1995 and six more in 1998. In 1998 29 sets of spare parts for the Conrado Yap class were also reportedly delivered. Sources even disagree on whether the first vessel commissioned, BRP Conrado Yap, had the hull number PG-840 or PG-841. All sources agree that PG-845 and PG-852 were utilized for spare parts. That the remaining ships had their armament reorganized and were likely subject to other minor changes and modifications likely led to the confusion. Ships in the Philippine Navy have historically been decommissioned, then later recommissioned out of necessity in different configurations in armament and other equipment.

BRP Conrado Yap (listed as PG-840), BRP Cosme Acosta (PG-843), BRP Nicanor Jimenez (PG-846), and BRP Leon Tadina (PG-848) were reportedly decommissioned on 7 June 2001. Though decommissioned, these ships likely remain in storage either awaiting funds for refit or to be cannibalized for spare parts. Remaining ships were seen with variable armament (as with the Tomas Batillo class, also acquired from the Republic of Korea), and had been refitted with additional electronic equipment such as satellite communication gear and stowage for external fuel drums to extend the vessel's range.

Ships in class

References

Patrol vessels of the Philippine Navy
Patrol boat classes
Ships built in South Korea